Paduk is a village in Kohgiluyeh and Boyer-Ahmad Province, Iran.

Paduk may also refer to:

Korean name for Go (game)
an alternate name for Padauk, the wood from several species of Pterocarpus